This is a list of South African Airways destinations, .

, South African Airways served eight destinations outside Africa. By that time, the top five international routes led from Johannesburg to New York City-JFK, London Heathrow, Hong Kong, Frankfurt and Perth.

List

See also

Transport in South Africa

References

External links
 
 
 
 
 

South African Airways
Lists of airline destinations
Star Alliance destinations